The Libyan Center for Remote Sensing and Space Science also known as LCRSSS, established in 1989, is a governmental research organization dedicated to the researches in remote sensing, space, and earthquake sciences, currently with more than 5 research stations. Headquartered in Tripoli, LCRSSS has a staff of close to 300 with an annual budget of about €7 million in 2008.

Education in Libya
Government of Libya